Gian-Luca Itter (born 5 January 1999), commonly known as Luca Itter, is a German professional footballer who plays as a left-back for 2. Bundesliga club Greuther Fürth.

Career
On 27 May 2019, VfL Wolfsburg announced that Itter would be joining SC Freiburg for the upcoming season. On June 3, 2022, Freiburg announced that Itter would join Greuther Fürth on a permanent basis.

Personal life
He is the twin brother of fellow professional footballer Davide Itter.

Career statistics

Honours
Individual
 Fritz Walter Medal U17 Gold: 2016

References

External links

1999 births
Living people
Sportspeople from Giessen
German footballers
Germany youth international footballers
Association football fullbacks
VfL Wolfsburg II players
VfL Wolfsburg players
SC Freiburg players
SpVgg Greuther Fürth players
Regionalliga players
Bundesliga players
2. Bundesliga players
Footballers from Hesse
Twin sportspeople
German twins